JATO Dynamics Ltd is a global supplier of automotive business intelligence, headquartered in Uxbridge, London.

History 
JATO operates offices in 45 countries and provides automotive intelligence in 50+ markets.  JATO was founded in 1984 by Jake Shafran for collecting and supplying competitive business intelligence for automotive manufacturers. Both trade and business media use JATO as an industry source.

Products and Services 
JATO supplies a number of different solutions and services that are based on primary and secondary research datasets. Some of the popular datasets include JATO Specifications, Volumes, and Incentives. After a recent partnership with LMC Automotive in 2015, JATO is now able to provide Volume forecasting through its existing suite of solutions.

External links

References

Automotive intelligence companies
Market research companies of the United States
Market research companies of the United Kingdom
Business services companies established in 1984
1984 establishments in the United States